Danepteryx is a genus of tropiduchid planthoppers in the family Tropiduchidae. There are about 6 described species in Danepteryx.

Species
 Danepteryx adiuncta Doering, 1940
 Danepteryx artemisiae Kirkaldy, 1908
 Danepteryx barbarae Kirkaldy, 1908
 Danepteryx lurida Melichar, 1906
 Danepteryx manca Uhler, 1889
 Danepteryx robusta Doering, 1940

References

Further reading

 
 
 

Auchenorrhyncha genera
Elicini